Andrews Academy is a Seventh-day Adventist secondary school (grades 9–12) located in Berrien Springs, Michigan. Andrews Academy's sister school, Ruth Murdoch Elementary School, handles students in grades K-8. Collectively, these two schools are known as the University Schools.

History 

Andrews Academy was established in 1922, when Emmanuel Missionary College (EMC), later renamed Andrews University, organized the institution with dedicated faculty. Before 1922, EMC included the elementary and high school grades as part of its institution's course offerings.  The academy currently occupies a  building adjacent to the campus of Andrews University.

Athletics
The Academy offers the following sports:
Basketball (boys & girls)
Soccer (boys & girls)
Flag Football (boys & girls)

Accreditation 
Andrews Academy is accredited by the Accrediting Association of Seventh-day Adventist Schools, Colleges and Universities and the North Central Association on Accreditation and School Improvement.

In 1984, the Academy was recognized by the United States Department of Education as a secondary School of Excellence. In 1991, it was recognized by the United States Department of Education as a model drug-free school.

Notable alumni
Shirley Neil Pettis – California politician

See also

Seventh-day Adventist education
List of Seventh-day Adventist secondary schools
Andrews University

References

External links 

Private high schools in Michigan
Educational institutions established in 1922
Adventism in Michigan
Andrews University
Adventist secondary schools in the United States
Schools in Berrien County, Michigan
1922 establishments in Michigan